Shoot (often written Shoot!), or Shoot Monthly, was a football magazine published in the UK between 1969 and 2008. It began publication as a weekly and was the strongest magazine in this market until the mid-1990s. It later became a monthly, before reverting to a weekly, and is now available as an interactive application.

Content
Shoot was noted throughout the 1970s and 1980s for the quality of its news stories and articles on all aspects of football in England and Scotland. Every week’s edition featured a colour two-page centrefold photo of a team, and several other glossy colour photographs of players from the top teams, usually but not exclusively in the first division. The magazine also had a "Focus On" feature that, along with the colour photo of a player, asked him to reveal some basic biographical information as well as some personal information, such as his favourite entertainer or his least favourite opponent. Throughout the 1970s the interviewed players' answer to 'person in the world you would most like to meet' was overwhelmingly boxer Muhammad Ali.

The magazine was also known for its "Star Writer" features. Each season a selection of big-name First Division players, including Alan Ball, Billy Bremner, Kenny Dalglish, Kevin Keegan, Bryan Robson and Charlie Nicholas, wrote (or had ghost-written for them) columns on their football lives. This feature continued in the monthly incarnation of the magazine, with stars including Joe Cole and Danny Mills penning regular columns.

The magazine also featured Paul Trevillion's You Are The Ref comic strip for many years. This strip was collected in book form in 2006.

League ladders
The weekly magazine was also known for its annual free gift of "Shoot League Ladders". This consisted of a thin cardboard sheet on which was printed slitted league tables for all the divisions of the Football League and Scottish League. Included in the package were tabs for all the teams, done up in the teams' colours, which could be fitted into the slits to reflect every team’s position in the standings. As the season progressed and teams moved up and down the table, their tabs could be adjusted accordingly. Old league ladders are still regularly sold on eBay.

History
In the 1970s Shoot merged with a rival publication, Goal, and for a while was sold as Shoot/Goal. Shoot'''s circulation hit a high of 120,000 copies per week in 1996. It changed to a monthly magazine in 2001, selling in excess of 33,000 copies a month. It was relaunched as a weekly magazine in late February 2008 before publishers IPC sold off the brand in August 2008.

Pedigree Group have licensed the brand since that date and have produced special editions of the magazine plus an on-line version and in June 2011 launched an app version. They also produce the Shoot Annual and a number of other Shoot publications and branded products.Shoot'' did not number their magazines but, as far as can be established, 1717 issues were printed. There were no issues for six weeks from 17 May to 21 June 1980 or for five weeks from 30 June to 28 July 1984 due to industrial action. When the magazine ran as a weekly, occasional 'double issues' were produced, particularly for the Christmas / New Year issue.

References

External links
Official Shoot website

1969 establishments in the United Kingdom
Association football magazines
Football mass media in the United Kingdom
Magazines established in 1969
Monthly magazines published in the United Kingdom
Sports magazines published in the United Kingdom
Weekly magazines published in the United Kingdom